Stráňany (previously until 1948 Folvark) is a village and municipality in Stará Ľubovňa District in the Prešov Region of northern Slovakia. The village is traditionally inhabited by Rusyns, as one of their westernmost settlements. There is Greek Catholic church built in 1857.

History
In historical records the village was first mentioned in 1343. Initially it was a hamlet of Veľký Lipník with a folvark (hence the name prior to 1948). Around 1567 Vlachs settled here, who would later become Rusyns.

Geography
The municipality lies at an altitude of 650 metres and covers an area of 11.607 km². It has a population of about 194 people.

Notable people
Gyula Cseszneky, Hungarian aristocrat, poet, cavalry officer.

References

External links
http://www.statistics.sk/mosmis/eng/run.html

Villages and municipalities in Stará Ľubovňa District